Jakób Jocz (1906–1983) was born in Vilnius, Lithuania, and studied in Germany, England, and Scotland. He received his Doctor of Philosophy and Doctor of Letters degrees from the University of Edinburgh, Scotland. He contributed to many professional journals and wrote four other books of Old Testament study and systematic theology. Jocz was ordained in the Anglican Church, and served for many years as Professor of Systematic Theology at Wycliffe Seminary, Toronto.

As a third-generation Hebrew Christian he was passionately interested in evangelism amongst Jews. However he also saw the need for a place of dialogue and sought to get the two communities to understand their past and get past the stereotypes.

Jocz most notable works are The Jewish People and Jesus Christ written in 1949 and on the distinctive nature of Israel and Church before God in his 1958 work A Theology of Election: Israel and the Church. He turned his attention in 1968 to the future destinies of both groups in his often reprinted The Covenant: A Theology of Human Destiny.

Works
His major works are as follows:

References

Footnotes

Bibliography

Further reading

 
 
 

1906 births
1983 deaths
20th-century Canadian Anglican priests
Alumni of the University of Edinburgh
Canadian Anglican theologians
Lithuanian emigrants to Canada
Lithuanian people of Jewish descent
People in Christian ecumenism
Systematic theologians
Academic staff of the University of Toronto